Richard Peters may refer to:

Richard Peters (priest) (1704–1776), Pennsylvania colonial minister, 
Richard Peters (Continental Congress) (1744–1828), also known as Richard Peters, Jr., Pennsylvania jurist, Continental Congressman, Continental Army official
Richard Peters (reporter) (1780–1848), also known as Richard Peters, Jr., Reporter of Decisions to the U.S. Supreme Court
Richard Peters (Atlanta) (1810–1889), founder of Atlanta, Georgia
Richard Peters (clubman) (1848–1921), American railroad engineer 
Richard Peters (American football) (1920–1973), American football coach at Ottawa University
Richard Stanley Peters (1919–2011), British philosopher
Richard Peters (cricketer) (1911–1989), English cricketer
Rick Peters (born 1966), American actor
Ricky Peters (born 1955), baseball center fielder

See also
Richard Peter (1895–1977), German press photographer and photojournalist
Richard Peter (Paralympian)
Richard Peterson (disambiguation)
Peter Richards (disambiguation)